Tyrone Township is the name of some places in the U.S. state of Michigan:

 Tyrone Township, Kent County, Michigan
 Tyrone Township, Livingston County, Michigan

See also
 Tyrone Township (disambiguation)

Michigan township disambiguation pages